Diplopseustis selenalis is a moth in the family Crambidae. It was described by George Hampson in 1906 and it is found in New Guinea, where it has been recorded from Fergusson Island.

References

Spilomelinae
Endemic fauna of New Guinea
Moths described in 1906
Moths of New Guinea
Taxa named by George Hampson